Canada has a total of 3,573 municipalities among its 10 provinces and 3 territories that are subject to some form of local government.

Matrix of municipalities

Lists by province

Alberta 
List of municipalities in Alberta
List of cities in Alberta
List of improvement districts in Alberta
List of Metis settlements in Alberta
List of municipal districts in Alberta
List of special areas in Alberta
List of specialized municipalities in Alberta
List of summer villages in Alberta
List of towns in Alberta
List of villages in Alberta

British Columbia 
List of municipalities in British Columbia
List of cities in British Columbia
List of district municipalities in British Columbia
List of towns in British Columbia
List of villages in British Columbia

Manitoba 
List of municipalities in Manitoba
List of cities in Manitoba
List of rural municipalities in Manitoba
List of towns in Manitoba
List of villages in Manitoba

New Brunswick 
List of municipalities in New Brunswick
List of cities in New Brunswick
List of rural communities in New Brunswick
List of towns in New Brunswick
List of villages in New Brunswick

Newfoundland and Labrador 
List of municipalities in Newfoundland and Labrador
List of cities in Newfoundland and Labrador
List of towns in Newfoundland and Labrador

Nova Scotia 
List of municipalities in Nova Scotia
List of counties of Nova Scotia
List of municipal districts in Nova Scotia
List of regional municipalities in Nova Scotia
List of towns in Nova Scotia

Ontario 
List of municipalities in Ontario
List of cities in Ontario
List of towns in Ontario
List of township municipalities in Ontario
List of villages in Ontario
Former municipalities in Ontario

Prince Edward Island 
List of municipalities in Prince Edward Island
List of cities in Prince Edward Island
List of towns in Prince Edward Island

Quebec 
List of municipalities in Quebec
List of northern villages in Quebec
List of parish municipalities in Quebec
List of township municipalities in Quebec
List of united township municipalities in Quebec
List of village municipalities in Quebec
List of villes in Quebec

Saskatchewan 
List of municipalities in Saskatchewan
List of cities in Saskatchewan
List of northern municipalities in Saskatchewan
List of resort villages in Saskatchewan
List of rural municipalities in Saskatchewan
List of towns in Saskatchewan
List of villages in Saskatchewan

Lists by territory

Northwest Territories 
List of municipalities in the Northwest Territories

Nunavut 
List of municipalities in Nunavut

Yukon 
List of municipalities in Yukon

See also 
List of the largest cities and towns in Canada by area
List of the largest municipalities in Canada by population

Notes

References